The Olympus Zuiko Digital ED 14-42mm 1:3.5-5.6 is an interchangeable kit zoom lens announced by Olympus Corporation on September 14, 2006.

References

Camera lenses introduced in 2006
014-042mm 1:3.5-5.6